New Albion was England's claim of North America above New Spain.

New Albion may also refer to:
New Albion (colony), an unsuccessful English colony in North America
New Albion, New York, a town in Western New York
New Albion Brewing Company, an early American microbrewery

See also

 Albion (disambiguation) 
 Because the name New Albion or Nova Albion means "New Britain", it is semantically and historically related to other similar names for British colonies, including: 
 New Britain (disambiguation)
 New Albion (disambiguation)
 New Scotland (disambiguation)
 Nova Scotia (disambiguation) 
 New Albany (disambiguation) 
 New Caledonia (disambiguation) 
 New England (disambiguation)
 New Wales (disambiguation)